Valeria Colmán Carrizo (born 25 July 1990) is a Uruguayan footballer who plays as a defender for Club Nacional de Football and the Uruguay women's national team.

International career
Colmán played for Uruguay in two Copa América Femenina editions (2014 and 2018).

References 

1990 births
Living people
Women's association football defenders
Uruguayan women's footballers
Uruguay women's international footballers
Club Nacional de Football players
Uruguayan women's futsal players